The 1975 PBA Second Conference Finals (officially named as the 1975 PBA Open Conference Finals) was the best-of-5 basketball championship series of the 1975 PBA Second Conference, and the conclusion of the conference's playoffs. The Toyota Comets and the Crispa Redmanizers played for the second championship contested by the league. 

The Toyota Comets won against the Crispa Redmanizers, 2–1.

Qualification

Games summary

Players' scoring averages

(*) Two games only, Fernandez did not see action in Game two because of a broken nose, Rocha was not fielded in Game one.

Occurrences
Toyota's Robert Jaworski and Crispa's Rudy Soriano were suspended in Game two for deliberately punching fellow players in the previous game of the championship series. Soriano blooded Ramon Fernandez' nose in a rebound scramble while Jaworski retaliated for Fernandez by hitting Soriano. Both were also fined aside from the one-game suspension. 

Crispa coach Baby Dalupan is fined P200 and suspended for one game after banging together the heads of referees Remigio Bartolome and Feliciano Santarina after the Redmanizers' Game 3 loss to Toyota.

On that same day on November 21, the PBA board rejects Crispa team manager Danny Floro's request for a change of referees. With Toyota leading the series, two games to one, following a 115–102 victory in Game three, the Redmanizers did not show up for Game four, therefore, the PBA forfeited the game and the championship series in favor of Toyota.

Broadcast notes

References

External links
 Crispa-Toyota rivalry

Crispa Redmanizers games
Toyota Super Corollas games
1975 PBA season
Crispa–Toyota rivalry
PBA Second Conference Finals